The 1986 Auckland City mayoral election was part of the New Zealand local elections held that same year. In 1986, elections were held for the Mayor of Auckland plus other local government positions including twenty city councillors. The polling was conducted using the standard first-past-the-post electoral method.

Background
Incumbent Labour Party Mayor Catherine Tizard was re-elected for a second term with a substantial majority over former Citizens & Ratepayers councillor Marie Quinn, while the council saw a landslide result to the Citizens & Ratepayers ticket.

Electoral reforms were implemented at the 1986 municipal elections, the method of electing councillors at large which had been used for decades was replaced with a ward system of local electoral districts.

Mayoralty results
The following table gives the election results:

Ward results

Candidates were also elected from wards to the Auckland City Council.

References

Mayoral elections in Auckland
1986 elections in New Zealand
Politics of the Auckland Region
1980s in Auckland
October 1986 events in New Zealand